The 1940 United States presidential election in Colorado took place on November 5, 1940, as part of the 1940 United States presidential election. State voters chose six representatives, or electors, to the Electoral College, who voted for president and vice president.

Colorado was won by Wendell Willkie (R–New York), running with Minority Leader Charles L. McNary, with 50.92% of the popular vote, against incumbent President Franklin D. Roosevelt (D–New York), running with Secretary Henry A. Wallace, with 48.37% of the popular vote.

Results

Results by county

References

Colorado
1940
1940 Colorado elections